is a railway station located in Kitakyūshū, Fukuoka.

Lines 

Chikuhō Electric Railroad
Chikuhō Electric Railroad Line

Platforms

Adjacent stations

Surrounding area
 Hagiwara Housing Complex
 Hagiwara Central Hospital
 Anoo Park
 Seirin High School
 Hagiwara Post Office

References

Railway stations in Fukuoka Prefecture
Railway stations in Japan opened in 1963